James Paton Hunter (born 19 June 1991) is an Australian-New Zealand basketball player for the Maitland Mustangs of the NBL1 East.

Early life
Hunter was born in Nowra, New South Wales, but spent much of his childhood living with his grandmother in Taumarunui, New Zealand. He subsequently obtained a New Zealand passport as a teenager.

For high school, Hunter attended Cranbrook School in the eastern suburbs of Sydney, where he was selected to represent Australia as part of the Australian Schoolboys' basketball team which traveled to the United States to compete in tournaments throughout North Carolina over a two-week period. He was also selected for the NSW Schoolboys State team and competed in the School Sport Australia Basketball Championship. Hunter also played rugby during his time at Cranbrook.

Between 2009 and 2011, Hunter also played in the Waratah League for the Sydney Comets.

College career
Hunter's first college stint in the United States was at Gillette College. After redshirting the 2010–11 season, he averaged 13.0 points and 6.8 rebounds in his lone season for Gillette in 2011–12. He transferred to Washington State in 2012 and played just 18 games in two seasons. For the 2014–15 season, he transferred to South Dakota and averaged 5.8 points and 3.5 rebounds in 32 games.

Professional career
Hunter returned to New Zealand in 2015 and joined the Manawatu Jets. In eight games during the New Zealand NBL season, he averaged 10.5 points and 6.5 rebounds per game.

For the 2015–16 season, Hunter played in Spain for Grupo INEC Zamora of the Liga EBA.

Hunter returned to Australia in 2016 and joined the Ballarat Miners of the South East Australian Basketball League (SEABL). He was awarded SEABL Player of the Week for Round 19. In 15 games for the Miners, he averaged 11.5 points and 6.3 rebounds per game.

In 2017, Hunter played for the Southland Sharks. In 18 games during the New Zealand NBL season, he averaged 7.8 points and 5.2 rebounds per game.

On 11 July 2017, Hunter signed with the New Zealand Breakers for the 2017–18 NBL season. On 8 January 2018, he was released by the Breakers. He appeared in two games for the Breakers, totalling five points. He later returned to the Southland Sharks for the 2018 New Zealand NBL season.

In 2019, Hunter played for the Knox Raiders in the NBL1.

Between 2020 and 2021, Hunter played for the Sydney Comets in the Waratah League.

In March 2022, Hunter signed with the Maitland Mustangs for the 2022 NBL1 East season.

National team career
Hunter played for New Zealand in the 2017 FIBA Asia Cup.

Personal
Hunter is the son of musicians Todd Hunter and Johanna Pigott. He also has an older brother, Harry, and a younger brother, Joey. His grandmother is Fijian.

References

External links
South Dakota bio
WSU bio
FIBA profile

1991 births
Living people
Australian men's basketball players
Australian expatriate basketball people in Spain
Australian expatriate basketball people in the United States
Centers (basketball)
Junior college men's basketball players in the United States
Manawatu Jets players
New Zealand Breakers players
People educated at Cranbrook School, Sydney
People from Nowra
South Dakota Coyotes men's basketball players
Southland Sharks players
Washington State Cougars men's basketball players
Basketball players from New South Wales